Amelinghausen is a Samtgemeinde ("collective municipality") in the district of Lüneburg, in Lower Saxony, Germany. Its seat is in the village Amelinghausen.

The Samtgemeinde Amelinghausen consists of the following municipalities:
 Amelinghausen
 Betzendorf
 Oldendorf (Luhe)
 Rehlingen
 Soderstorf

Waterbodies 

The Lopausee lies on the parish boundary of Amelinghausen on the upper reaches of the Lopau. This artificial lake has an area of about 12 ha and is a popular destination in the Lüneburg Heath. It was laid out in the 1970s as part of projects to improve the landscape.

References

Amelinghausen
Samtgemeinden in Lower Saxony